Huatugou Airport  is an airport in Mangnai, a county-level city of Haixi Mongol and Tibetan Autonomous Prefecture in Qinghai Province, China. Construction began on 30 December 2011 with an estimated total investment of 700 million yuan. The airport was opened on 26 June 2015.

Facilities
The airport has a runway that is 3,600 meters long, and a 3,000 square-meter terminal building.  It is projected to handle 90,000 passengers annually by 2020.

Airlines and destinations

See also
List of airports in China
List of the busiest airports in China
List of highest airports

References

Airports in Qinghai
Airports established in 2015
2015 establishments in China
Haixi Mongol and Tibetan Autonomous Prefecture